The Navi Mumbai Metro is a rapid transit system under construction in the Indian city of Navi Mumbai, Maharashtra. The planning and construction of the Navi Mumbai Metro is being overseen by the City and Industrial Development Corporation (CIDCO). The foundation stone for the project was laid on 1 May 2011; following construction delays, the metro's first line was projected to open in 2020. However, due to the ongoing COVID-19 pandemic, which caused lockdowns, curfews, and lack of labour, which resulted in several delays in construction, the deadline is pushed to 2022 for completion of the first line (Line 1) of Navi Mumbai Metro. The metro's rolling stock are being provided by CSR Zhuzhou.

History
The Navi Mumbai Metro projects received formal approval on 29 April 2010, and a public hearing on 21 May 2010 reported no major objections to the plan. CIDCO was named as the implementing agency of the Belapur–Pendhar–Kalamboli–Khandeshwar line, under the Indian Tramway Act 1886, by the Government of Maharashtra on 30 September 2010. The metro's foundation stone was laid on 1 May 2011 by Chief Minister Prithviraj Chavan, and general foundation work on the system's first phase commenced in October 2011. In March 2012, CIDCO released the metro's complete master plan, including a proposed connection to the Mumbai Metro. In February 2017, RITES submitted an interim detailed project report (DPR) for Lines II, III and IV of the Navi Mumbai Metro.

In February 2013, thousands of villagers in the Navi Mumbai area protested against CIDCO's inaction on local housing developments and its failure to provide restitution for locals affected by infrastructure projects. The protesters pledged to "shut down the CIDCO head office and all development projects in the region. These will include the metro project and any progress on the airport project".

Network
The Navi Mumbai Metro is planned to consist of five lines, totaling  in length. , Line 1 of the metro is under construction, with operation projected to commence in 2022.

Line 1

All the phases of Line 1 will be constructed and funded by CIDCO. Lines 2 and 3 will be funded by the Navi Mumbai Municipal Corporation and Mumbai Metropolitan Region Development Authority respectively. The total cost of Line 1 is estimated to be .

Construction
The  Line 1 consists of 20 stations. The proposed route will link CBD Belapur, Kharghar, Taloja, Taloja MIDC, Kalamboli, Kamothe and the Khandeshwar railway station, terminating at the proposed Navi Mumbai International Airport.

In mid-2012, CIDCO awarded the  contract for the construction of the 11.1 km section from Belapur to Pendhar to a consortium of Sanjose (Spain), Mahavira Road and Infrastructure (Navi Mumbai), and Supreme Infrastructure (Mumbai). The original deadline to complete the project was in 2016. This was later extended to mid-2017, and then mid-2018. By January 2017, only 60% of the work on the stations had been completed. Finding the progress of work to be unsatisfactory, CIDCO sent a notice terminating the contract to the consortium on 11 January 2017. On 1 March 2017, CIDCO floated new tenders to construct 11 stations along the Belapur-Pendhar section. The previous contractors had completed 60% of the work on the stations. The new contract with worth .

Line 1 is planned to be developed in 3 phases:

Infrastructure
An international consortium of companies including Ansaldo STS, Tata Projects and CSR Zhuzhou will provide the electrical and mechanical systems for the first phase of Line 1. Ansaldo will conduct systems integration and supply train control systems, telecoms, fare collection systems and equipment storage. The metro's standard gauge network would be electrified at 25 kV AC, with power provided via an overhead catenary.

Rolling stock
In 2014, the Chinese company CSR Zhuzhou signed a contract with CIDCO to supply rolling stock for the first phase of the metro's Line 1. The trains would feature stainless steel bodies, air-conditioning and LED lighting.

Status Updates

 Dec 2018: Work of elevated corridor almost complete, 50% work on signalling is done and 68% station related work in done.
 Mar 2019: Two sets of much-awaited 3- coach metro train for Navi Mumbai Metro arrived at Mumbai Port from China.
 Aug 2019: Metro trial run between Panchanand to Pendhar of Line-1 to start from 5 September. Line 1 is expected to be fully operational by mid-2020.
 Sep 2019: Between Panchanand and Pendhar metro line of 11 km, 83% work done on station, some track laying done. Trial run started on 3 km of track which is ready. Stations to be ready by December 2019. Full trial run on 11 km of track to start in January 2020.
Sep 2020: Due to COVID-19 pandemic, which caused lockdowns, curfews and lack of labour in construction, City and Industrial Development Corporation (CIDCO) pushes deadline for completion of Navi Mumbai Metro Project to 2024.
Sep 2020: Construction work resumed.
Jan 2021: Mahametro to complete Navi Mumbai Metro's Line 1.
Apr 2021: Tenders invited for Navi Mumbai Metro construction of balanced works for Line 1.
May 2021: City and Industrial Development Corporation (CIDCO) successfully completes first trial run of Navi Mumbai Metro from Kharghar Metro Station to Taloja Depot.
Jun 2021: Bids invited for access control system at 11 elevated stations of Navi Mumbai Metro's Line 1.
Jul 2021: MahaMetro to operate and maintain Navi Mumbai Metro's Line 1.
Aug 2021: Trial run of Navi Mumbai Metro's entire Line 1 from Central Park Metro Station to Pendhar metro station will be conducted by Research Design and Standard Organization (RDSO) on 28 August.
Aug 2021: Research Design and Standard Organization (RDSO) successfully conducts trial run of Navi Mumbai Metro from central park Metro Station to Pendhar Metro Station, and begins Oscillation Trial and Emergency Braking Distance (EBD) trial of the metro, which is to be conducted in two phases, in which the purpose is to test the dynamic behaviour of the rolling stock in different conditions, with regard to safety, stability and quality rides. These two trials will continue until mid-September, as of 31 August.
Sep 2021: Research Design and Standard Organization (RDSO) successfully conducts Oscillation Trial and Emergency Braking Distance (EBD) trial of the metro. City and Industrial Development Corporation (CIDCO) confirms partial opening of the metro by December.
Oct 2021: The stretch of Line-1 of Navi Mumbai Metro from Pendhar to Central Park in Kharghar will be opened by December.
Nov 2021: Navi Mumbai Metro gets Interim Speed Certificate from RDSO for Line-1.
Jan 2022: Safety trials for Line-1 will be conducted on 17–18 January by the Commission of Railway Safety (CMRS). After the trials, the CMRS will give a safety certificate, after which Line-1 will begin commercial operations.
Mar 2022: The final inspection by the CMRS team started on the 7 and 8 March.

Gallery
Some images of the under-construction Belapur Terminal Station.

See also

 Urban rail transit in India
 Mumbai Metro
 Pune Metro
 Nagpur Metro
 Greater Nashik Metro
 List of metro systems
 Public transport in Mumbai
NAVI MUMBAI MERTO STATUS

References

 
Transport in Navi Mumbai
Airport rail links in India
Standard gauge railways in India